Megavalanche (nicknamed "Mega") is a enduro mountain bike race held annually at the Alpe d'Huez ski resort in the French Alps since 1995, and annually on the island of Réunion.

The Alps event, being the more widely publicized and famous among downhill cycling enthusiasts, starts on the glaciated summit of Pic Blanc in Huez and descends to the valley bottom at Allemond, for a total of over 2,600 vertical meters (8530 feet) and a 20 km (12 miles) distance. 

The mass-start race is known for its fast speeds and winding turns over varying terrain, with hundreds of riders descending the mountain at once. Despite the inherent dangers, officials state that injuries are modest, and that the race is less dangerous than it may seem to outsiders. The course is designed to slow the riders down around tight curves and the width of the glacier at the race's start line allows the riders to spread out.

History 
The Megavalanche race was the creation of mountain bike pioneer George Edwards, who was involved in creating some of the first downhill tracks in Europe. The first race, held in 1995, saw 400 riders in attendance. The race has been managed by Edwards since its inception, and is organized by his company, UCC. The exact route of the course may change from year to year, depending on terrain and weather conditions, taking riders between 20 minutes to over 1 hour to complete, but on average lasts 35-50 minutes.

The 2007 race saw a significant increase in participants from outside France, likely driven by an increase in press coverage of the event. The 2013 race saw 2000 riders in attendance from over 30 countries.

On November 11, 2018, Edwards issued a statement notifying participants that the 2018 Réunion Mega race was cancelled. He stated UCC race organizers had "taken note of the prefectural orders not to authorize the organization of the event", due to the yellow vests protests taking place across France.

Megavalanche organizers announced in 2018 a series of races entitled the 'European Mass Start Series', including the Megavalanche race and other races dubbed 'Maxiavalanches' (using the same mass-start format), to take place in 2019. The winner of the series' races will receive travel, accommodations and entry fees covered for the Reunion Island Megavalanche race.

Race Format 
Since 2014, the format of the event follows three main days:

Practice Day - Lifts and courses are open and free to anyone with a race plate. Riders are encouraged to familiarize themselves with the course.
Qualifiers - Riders run qualifying races consisting of six heats of about 250 riders. The resulting qualifier times are broken down into starting lines designated by a letter, with 'A' being the front.
Race Day - The top 25 riders from each Qualifier start the race. The following 25 from each qualifier then race in a similarly mass-started event called the 'Megavalanche Challenger'. Any riders outside these two categories are grouped into the 'Megavalanche Amateur', and the two 'Affinity' groups 1 and 2 where they can start at any time after the first two mass start races. Riders' times are recorded automatically by transponder chip.

Results

Megavalanche Alpe D'Huez

Megavalanche Réunion

External links

Official Site
Race Results
2017 Megavalanche Official Movie (YouTube, UCC Sporting Event MTB)
Megavalanche 2018 - Damien Oton Winning Run POV (YouTube, Damien Oton)

References 

Mountain biking events
Mountain biking in France